Víctor José Corrales Vaquero (born 12 March 1989) is a Spanish middle-distance runner competing primarily in the 1500 metres. He represented his country at the 2015 World Championships in Beijing without advancing from the first round.

Competition record

Personal bests
Outdoor
800 metres – 1:48.12 (Madrid 2013)
1500 metres – 3:37.70 (Mataró 2015)

Indoor
1500 metres – 3:45.45 (Sabadell 2014)

References

External links

1989 births
Living people
Spanish male middle-distance runners
World Athletics Championships athletes for Spain
Place of birth missing (living people)
21st-century Spanish people